Paulo Valentim is a Portuguese fado guitarist and composer. His compositions include Romper Madrugadas recorded by Katia Guerreiro.

References 

Living people
Portuguese fado guitarists
Year of birth missing (living people)